The 1976 Cam 2 Motor Oil 400 was a NASCAR Winston Cup Series race that took place on June 20, 1976, at Michigan International Speedway in Brooklyn, Michigan.

Background
Opened in 1968, the track's turns are banked at eighteen degrees, while the 3,600-foot-long front stretch, the location of the finish line, is banked at twelve degrees. The back stretch, has a five degree banking and is 2,242 feet long.

Race report
David Pearson defeated Cale Yarborough by three car lengths in front of an audience of 46,000. There were 17 lead changes and three cautions for 20 out of the 200 laps. The race took two hours and fifty minutes. Joe Frasson finished last due to an engine problem on lap 2. All 36 of the drivers on the racing grid were American-born males. The field was dominated by Chevrolet vehicles as opposed to Ford and Mercury vehicles.

Cale Yarborough dominated most of this race, with radio announcer Ken Squier saying it was one of the best runs he'd  seen Cale have, but in the closing stages it was David Pearson out front and cruising to a win when a late caution came out for Coo Coo Marlin's blown engine while he was running seventh in the closing laps. Under the yellow the leaders all pitted with Yarborough regaining the lead only for Pearson to pass him on the backstretch after the restart and take the win. Overall it was still a good day for Yarborough as he capitalized on a 74-point swing in the point standings to vault back into the points lead as a result of Benny Parsons' issues. He would eventually become the 1976 NASCAR Winston Cup Series champion.

Bobby Allison was running second very late when he was black flagged for the Penske team having put tape over parts of the grill of his Cam 2 #2 Mercury. That aerodynamic improvement was illegal at the time but later became commonplace. Allison still recovered to finish third in part due to how few cars were left on the lead lap and the late caution.

The grand total of this race's prize purse was $105,355 ($ when considering inflation).

Qualifying

Results

Standings after the race

References

Cam 2 Motor Oil 400
Cam 2 Motor Oil 400
NASCAR races at Michigan International Speedway